This is a list of notable Irish American actors.

To be included in this list, the person must have a Wikipedia article and references showing the person is Irish American and a notable actor.

The list is organized in reverse chronological order of birth decades and all of the actors' surnames are in alphabetical order.

21st Century

2000s
 Raymond Ochoa (2001– )

20th Century
 Frankie Jonas (2000– )
 Fátima Ptacek (2000– )

1990s
 Jake T. Austin (1994– )
 Angus Cloud (1998– )
 Chris Colfer (1990– )
 Miranda Cosgrove (1993– )
 Zoey Deutch (1994– )
 Noah Galvin (1994– )
 Nick Jonas (1992– )
 Demi Lovato (1992– )
 Dylan O'Brien (1991– )
 Jack Reynor (1992– ) Dual Irish and American citizen
 AnnaSophia Robb (1993– )
 Emma Roberts (1991– )
 Saoirse Ronan (1994– ) Dual Irish and American citizen

1980s
 Mischa Barton (1986– )
 Amanda Bynes (1986– )
 Lauren Cohan (1982– )
 Darren Criss (1987– )
 Kieran Culkin (1982– )
 Macaulay Culkin (1980– )
 Rory Culkin (1989– )
 Zooey Deschanel (1980– )
 Aarón Díaz (1982– )
 Alyssa Diaz (1985– )
 Chris Evans (1981– )
 Megan Fox (1986– )
 David Gallagher (1985– )
 Sasha Grey (1988– )
 Anne Hathaway (1982– )
 Vanessa Hudgens (1988– )
 Joe Jonas (1989– )
 Kevin Jonas (1987– )
 Scarlett Keegan (1984– )
 Anna Kendrick (1985– )
 Beyoncé Knowles (1981– )
 Lindsay Lohan (1986– )
 Jena Malone (1984– )
 Kate Mara (1983– )
 Rooney Mara (1985– )
 John Mulaney (1982– )
 Frankie Muniz (1985– )
 Olivia Munn (1980– )
 Chord Overstreet (1989– )
 Penny Pax (1988– )
 Christina Ricci (1980– )
 Julia Stiles (1981– )
 Emma Stone (1988– )
 Jessica Sutta (1982– )
 Jonathan Tucker (1982– )
 Olivia Wilde (1984– )
 Deborah Ann Woll (1985– )

1970s
 Ben Affleck (1972– )
 Casey Affleck (1975– )
 Mackenzie Astin (1973– )
 Sean Astin (1971– )
 Elizabeth Banks (1974– )
 Drew Barrymore (1975– )
 Lara Flynn Boyle (1970– )
 Eddie Cahill (1978– )
 Holly Marie Combs (1973– )
 Jennifer Connelly (1970– )
 Dane Cook (1972– )
 Bradley Cooper (1975– )
 Monique Gabriela Curnen (1970– )
 Emily Deschanel (1976– )
 Carmen Electra (1972– )
 Jimmy Fallon (1974– )
 Heather Graham (1970– )
 Carla Gugino (1971– )
 Alyson Hannigan (1974– )
 Angie Harmon (1972– )
 Josh Hartnett  (1978– )
 Katherine Heigl (1978– )
 Joshua Jackson (1978– )
 Dwayne Johnson (1972– )
 Robert Kelly (1970– )
 Jamie Kennedy (1970– )
 Ashton Kutcher (1978– )
 Eric Mabius (1971– )
 Rachael MacFarlane (1976– )
 Seth MacFarlane (1973– )
 Danny Masterson (1976– )t
 Jenny McCarthy (1972– )
 Rose McGowan (1973– )
 Danica McKellar (1975– )
 Jason Momoa (1979– )
 Bridget Moynahan (1971– )
 Brittany Murphy (1977–2009)
 Charlie O'Connell (1975– )
 Jerry O'Connell (1974– )
 Chris O'Donnell (1970– )
 Jason O'Mara (1972– ) Dual Irish and American citizen
 Heather O'Rourke (1975–1988)
 Ana Ortiz (1971– )
 Monica Potter (1971– )
 Maggie Q (1979– )
 Zachary Quinto (1977– )
 Jeremy Renner (1971– )
 Ryan Reynolds (1976– )
 Robin Tunney (1972– )
 Vince Vaughn (1970– )
 Mark Wahlberg (1971– )
 Paul Walker (1973–2013)
 Luke Wilson (1971– )

1960s
 Jennifer Aniston (1969– )
 Daniel Baldwin (1960– )
 Stephen Baldwin (1966– )
 William Baldwin (1963– )
 Jennifer Beals (1963– )
 Matthew Broderick (1962– )
 Edward Burns (1968– )
 Dean Cain (1966– )
 Mariah Carey (1969– )
 Jim Carrey (1962– )
 James Caviezel (1968– )
 George Clooney (1961– )
 Stephen Colbert (1964– )
 Tom Cruise (1962– )
 John Cusack (1966– )
 Kim Delaney (1961– )
 Patrick Dempsey (1966– )
 Johnny Depp (1963– )
 Matt Dillon (1964– )
 Robert Downey, Jr. (1965– )
 Karen Duffy (1962– )
 Emilio Estevez (1962– )
 Ramon Estevez (1963– )
 Renée Estevez (1967– )
 Chris Farley (1964–1997)
 Will Ferrell (1967– )
 Neil Flynn (1960– )
 Jorja Fox (1968– )
 Brendan Fraser (1968– )
 Janeane Garofalo (1964– )
 Paul Giamatti (1967– )
 Lauren Graham (1967– )
 Kathy Griffin (1960– )
 Anthony Michael Hall (1968– )
 Bonnie Hunt (1961– )
 Moira Kelly (1968– )
 Matthew McConaughey (1969– )
 Dylan McDermott (1961– )
 Neal McDonough (1966– )
 Dermot Mulroney (1963– )
 Rosie O'Donnell (1962– )
 Mike O'Malley (1966– )
 Conan O'Brien (1963– )
 Chris Penn (1965–2006)
 Sean Penn (1960– )
 Ellen Pompeo (1969– )
 John C. Reilly (1965– )
 Julia Roberts (1967– )
 Molly Shannon (1964– )
 Charlie Sheen (1965– )
 Ben Stiller (1965– )
 Courtney Thorne-Smith (1967– )
 Maura Tierney (1965– )
 Donnie Wahlberg (1969– )
 Andrew Wilson (1964– )
 Owen Wilson (1968– )
 Dean Winters (1964– )
 Scott William Winters (1965– )

1950s
 Alec Baldwin (1958– ) 
 Pierce Brosnan (1953– ) Dual Irish and American citizen
 Steve Buscemi (1957– )
 Lynda Carter (1951– )
 David Caruso (1956– )
 Dana Carvey (1955– )
 Lenny Clarke (1953– )
 Kevin Conroy (1955– )
 Kevin Costner (1955– ) 
 Dana Delany (1956– )
 Bo Derek (1956– )
 Ann Dowd (1956-)
 Jeff Fahey (1952– )
 Peter Gallagher (1955– )
 Mel Gibson (1956– ) Dual Irish and American citizen
 Patricia Heaton (1958– )
 Marg Helgenberger (1958– )
 Nathan Lane (1956– )
 Denis Leary (1957– ) Dual Irish and American citizen
 Bill Maher (1956– )
 James McCaffrey (1959– )
 Mary McDonnell (1952– )
 John C. McGinley (1959– )
 Kate Mulgrew (1955– )
 Bill Murray (1950– )
 Liam Neeson (1952– ) Dual Irish and American citizen
 Michael O'Keefe (1955– )
 Terry O'Quinn (1952– )
 Aidan Quinn (1959– )
 Colin Quinn (1959– )
 Mickey Rourke (1952– )
 John Sayles (1950– )
 Ray Sharkey (1952–1993)
 Julia Sweeney (1959– )
 John Travolta (1954– )

1940s
 Tanya Roberts (1949–2021)
 Armand Assante (1949– )
 Tom Berenger (1949– )
 Bud Cort (1946– )
 Patrick Cronin (1941– )
 Robert De Niro (1943– )
 Patrick Duffy (1949– )
 Patty Duke (1946–2016)
 Joe Estevez (1946– )
 Mia Farrow (1945– )
 Harrison Ford (1942– )
 Teri Garr (1944– )
 Dennis Holahan (1942– )
 Diane Keaton (1946– )
 Kevin Kline (1947– )
 Liza Minnelli (1946– )
 Michael Moriarty (1941– )
 Ryan O'Neal (1941– )
 Ed O'Neill (1946– )
 Susan Sarandon (1946– )
 Martin Sheen (1940– ) Dual Irish and American citizen
 Suzanne Somers (1946– )
 Meryl Streep (1949-)

1930s
 Stephen Boyd (1931–1977)
 Peter Boyle (1935–2006)
 Eileen Brennan (1932–2013)
 Ellen Burstyn (1932– )
 George Carlin (1937–2008)
 Tim Conway (1933–2019) 
 Brian Dennehy (1938–2020)
 Clint Eastwood (1930– ) 
 Mike Farrell (1939– )
 Joan Hackett (1934–1983)
 James Earl Jones (1931– ) 
 Malachy McCourt (1931– )
 Jason Miller (1939–2001)
 Jack Nicholson (1937– )
 Bryan O'Byrne (1931–2009)
 Elvis Presley (1935–1977)
 Robert Redford (1936– )
 Roy Scheider (1932–2008)

1920s
 Steve Allen (1921–2000)
 Marlon Brando (1924–2004)
 Jack Cassidy (1927–1976)
 Timothy Carey (1929-1994)
 Rosemary Clooney (1928–2002)
 Charles Durning (1923–2012)
 Judy Garland (1922–1969)
 Grace Kelly (1929–1982)
 Jack Kelly (1927–1992)
 Tommy Kelly (1925–2016)
 Jack Lord (1920–1998)
 Theo Marcuse (1920–1967)
 Patrick McGoohan (1928–2009).
 Anne Meara (1929–2015)
 Dickie Moore (1925–2015)
 Audie Murphy (1925–1971)
 Carroll O'Connor (1924–2001)
 Donald O'Connor (1925–2003)
 Maureen O'Hara (1920–2015) Dual Irish and American citizen
 Eileen Ryan (1927– )
 Maureen Stapleton (1925–2006)
 Gene Tierney (1920–1991)

1910s
 Lucille Ball (1911–1989)
 Art Carney (1918–2003)
 Geraldine Fitzgerald (1913–2005)
 Jackie Gleason (1916–1987)
 Susan Hayward (1917–1975)
 Rita Hayworth (1918–1987
 Gene Kelly (1912–1996)
 Dorothy Lamour (1914–1996)
 Burt Lancaster (1913–1994)
 Robert Mitchum (1917–1997)
 Edmond O'Brien (1915–1985)
 Virginia O'Brien (1919–2001)
 Maureen O'Sullivan (1911–1998) Born in Ireland, naturalized US citizen
 Gregory Peck (1916–2003) 
 Tyrone Power (1914–1958)
 Anthony Quinn (1915–2001)
 Ronald Reagan (1911–2004)

1900s
 Don Ameche (1908–1993)
 George Brent (1904–1979) Born in Ireland, naturalized US citizen
 Lon Chaney Jr. (1906–1973)
 Joan Crawford (1903–1977)
 Bing Crosby (1903–1977)
 Brian Donlevy (1901–1972)
 James Dunn (1905–1967)
 Errol Flynn (1909–1959)
 Greer Garson (1904–1996)
 Helen Hayes (1900–1993) 
 John Huston (1906–1987) Renounced American citizenship and took up Irish citizenship in 1964
 Lloyd Nolan (1902–1985)
 Irene Ryan (1902–1973)
 Spencer Tracy (1900–1967) 
 John Wayne (1907–1979)
 Robert Young (1907–1998)

19th Century

1890s
 Gracie Allen (1895–1964)
 Walter Brennan (1894–1974)
 James Cagney (1899–1986)
 Buster Keaton (1895–1966) 
 Charles Laughton (1899–1962)
 Thomas Mitchell (1892–1962)
 Pat O'Brien (1899–1983)

1880s
 Lon Chaney (1883–1930) 
 William S. Hart (1884–1946) 
 Walter Huston (1884–1950)

1870s
 Sara Allgood (1879–1950) Dual Irish and American citizen
 George M. Cohan (1878–1942)

1850s
 Eddie Foy (1856–1928)

1830s
 William E. Sheridan (1839–1887)

1820s
 Barney Williams (1824–1876)

References

External links
 The Irish in Film

Actors
Irish American
Irish